Sana Takeda (born 1977) is a Japanese illustrator and comic book artist known for her work on the Hugo Award winning series Monstress.

Takeda was born in Niigata, and now resides in Tokyo, Japan. At age 20 Takeda started working as a 3D CGI designer for Sega, creating pictures of soccer and NBA athletes. She became a freelance artist when she was 25. After sending her portfolio to C. B. Cebulski, she began working on several projects for Marvel Comics, including X-Men, Venom,   Civil War II and Ms. Marvel. In 2006-2008 she worked with C. B. Cebulski on their creator-owned series Drain. In 2010 she started to work with Marjorie Liu on X-23 for Marvel Comics and in 2013 the two started to work on their creator-owned series Monstress.

The artists identified by Takeda as major influences include: Kuniyoshi Utagawa’s ukiyo-e woodblock prints, Shigeru Mizuki’s yōkai (Japanese spirits) art, and illustrations of Ishihara Gōjin.

Bibliography

Interior Art
 X-Men Fairy Tales #1 (Marvel, 2006)
 Drain (Image Comics, 2006-2008)
 X-Men Divided We Stand #1, part 2 (Marvel, 2008)
 Ms. Marvel Vol. 2 #39, 40, 42, 44, 46, 48-50 (Marvel, 2009-2010)
 Web of Spider-man Vol. 2 #9-11 (Marvel, 2010)-
 X-Men Forever Annual (with colorist Simone Peruzzi, Marvel, 2010)
 What If? Dark Reign (Marvel, 2010)
 X-23 Vol. 3 #3, 7, 10-12, 17-19 (Marvel, 2010-2011)
 Incredible Hulks #621, part 2 (Marvel, 2011)
 Venom Vol. 2 #13.2 (Marvel, 2012)
 Soulfire: Shadow Magic Volume 1 (Aspen Comics, 2013)
 Civil War II: Choosing Sides #6, part 2 (Marvel, 2016)
Monstress (Image Comics, 2015-)
The Night Eaters (Abrams, 2022)

References

External links
 

Living people
Japanese illustrators
1977 births
Eisner Award winners for Best Cover Artist
Eisner Award winners for Best Painter/Multimedia Artist (Interior)
Hugo Award-winning artists